Nu Dimension are an Indonesian four-piece boy band formed in 2012, consisting of members Romy Syalasa Putra, Johanan Ariel Matulessy, Bagus Cahya Adi and Ryan Hartanto Tedja. They were formed exclusively for the first season Indonesian version of The X Factor. They signed with Ahmad Dhani's Republik Cinta Management after being formed and finishing third in the first season X Factor Indonesia.

History

2012-present: Formation and The X Factor 
Nu Dimension are four solo artists who met during boot camp for the first season Indonesian version of The X Factor. The members of the group are Romy Syalasa, Joel Matulessy, Bagus Cahya and Ryan Hartanto. They successfully auditioned as soloists but failed on a bootcamp challenge. Then they were later formed as a group by the judges to give them another chance. They performed Michael Jackson's "Man in the Mirror" at the judges' home visit round and was selected to join Dhani in the live shows. In week 1, they sang George Michael's "Careless Whisper" and received positive feedback from the judges. They successfully surprised the judges after performing Michael Jackson's "Thriller" with Halloween-themed setting in week 3. For the first 3 weeks, Nu Dimension always placed number one at the end of the episodes. In week 4, they sang Brian McKnight's "One Last Cry". In week 6, they sang Queen's "Killer Queen" and received mixed feedback from the judges, where some judges were not impressed with the song choice. Despite this, they received another praise from the judges in the following week after performing Britney Spears' "Toxic". In week 8, they sang "Istimewa" and "Don't You Worry Child". Despite receiving positive feedback from the judges, they were in the bottom two with Isa Raja and sang "After the Love Has Gone" for survival. Dhani and Rossa voted in their favor, but Anggun and Bebi voted to save Isa Raja instead, causing the judges' votes to be deadlocked and reverted to the public vote. It was then revealed that Isa Raja received fewer votes, causing Nu Dimension to stay in the competition for another week. In week 9, they collaborate with Mulan Jameela sing "Cinta Mati III" and received a negative feedback by the judges and said that they just sounds like a 'backing vocalists'. In week 10 they sang an epic performance "Supermassive Black Hole" and received praises by the judges. In week 11, they sang "Points of Authority" by Linkin Park and the judges said that it was the best performance of the night, And a tribute song "Cobalah Mengerti" by Noah. In The Top Three, They sang "Only Girl" by Rihanna and received a positive feedback from the judges. In the second song, they sang "Virtual Insanity" with collaborated with Their mentor and received a funny feedback, other judges said Nu Dimension shouldn't be in wrong way and shouldn't collaborated with their mentor.

Performances on X Factor Indonesia season 1

Nu Dimension performed the following songs on X Factor Indonesia:

Members

Romy Syalasa 
Romy Syalasa Putra, born , is from Mataram, West Nusa Tenggara. His first audition was "Wild World" by Mr. Big's version.

Bagus Cahya 
Bagus Cahya Adi, born , is from Wonogiri, Central Java. His first audition was "Just The Way You Are by Bruno Mars.

Joel Matulessy 
Johanan Ariel "El" Matulessy, born , is from Makassar. His first audition was "Kasih Putih" by Glenn Fredly.

Ryan Hartanto 
Ryan Hartanto Tedja, born , is from Surabaya, East Java. His first audition was "I Believe I Can Fly" by R. Kelly.

References

External links
Official fansite
Nu Dimension on Twitter
Contestant - Nu Dimension :: X Factor Indonesia

2012 establishments in Indonesia
Musical groups established in 2012
Indonesian boy bands
Vocal quartets
X Factor Indonesia contestants